Euzophera ostricolorella, the root collar borer moth or tuliptree borer, is a species of moth of the family Pyralidae. It was described by George Duryea Hulst in 1890. The species is found in the United States from Arkansas and Louisiana to northern Florida, north to Michigan and New York.

The wingspan is 30–41 mm. The forewings are dull purplish red except for a dark purplish-gray median area. The hindwings are whitish to pale gray with a brown terminal line and white fringe. Adults are on wing from April to June and again from August to October in two generations in the southern part of the range.

The larvae feed on Liriodendron tulipifera. They bore into the bark and feed on the phloem at base of their host plant. They are dull white with a dark brown head. They reach a length of about 33 mm.

References

Moths described in 1890
Phycitini
Moths of North America